Link: The Faces of Evil and Zelda: The Wand of Gamelon are action-adventure games developed by Animation Magic and published by Philips Interactive Media for the CD-i in 1993. They were released on the same day, were developed simultaneously, and look and play similarly because they use the same graphic engine. Both games are based on Nintendo's The Legend of Zelda franchise, but are not considered official entries and are the first two games of three Zelda games released for the CD-i. The third, Zelda's Adventure, was developed separately and plays differently.

Link: The Faces of Evil puts the player in control of Link, who goes on a quest to defeat Ganon and rescue Princess Zelda. Zelda: The Wand of Gamelon changes the roles and has the player control Zelda, who sets out to save Link and King Harkinian and defend her kingdom from Ganon. Both travel to a new world (Koridai and Gamelon, respectively) to thwart Ganon's plans. At the time of their release, the games received mixed to positive reviews. In later years, both games, along with Zelda's Adventure and Mario game Hotel Mario, have been panned by critics for their plots, full-motion video cutscenes, voice acting, controls, and graphics. This has led to the three games being considered not only the worst games in the Zelda franchise but also among the worst video games of all time.

Gameplay
Players take control of Link in The Faces of Evil, and of Zelda in The Wand of Gamelon. At the beginning of both games, players have access to only three areas, which are accessed through an in-game map. The two characters only have their swords and shields at this stage. The sword can be used to attack enemies either by stabbing or shooting "Power Blasts", while the shield can deflect attacks. Link's sword in The Faces of Evil is known as his Smart Sword, and will not hurt anyone considered friendly. The shield is used whenever the player character is standing still or crouching. They gain new items later on in the game, including lamp oil, rope, and bombs, all of which can be purchased from a shop. Rubies (rupees in canon Zelda games) can be obtained by stabbing them with the sword after defeating an enemy; after which they can be spent at the shop.

The player's health is measured in "Life Hearts". Although the player begins the game with only three hearts, there are ways to earn more. Each time the player character is injured, they will lose at least one-half of a heart. The first two times the player runs out of Life Hearts, the player will be given the option of continuing from near the point where their last heart was lost. When the player loses their hearts for the third time, they will be returned to the map and must start the level from the beginning. Returning to the map replenishes their Life Hearts and lives, and they will retain any items and Rubies they picked up.

Plot

Link: The Faces of Evil
The story begins in Hyrule Castle, where a bored Link discusses the prospects of new adventure with King Harkinian. To describe the way he feels, Link cries to the king: "Gee! it sure is boring around here". Soon, Link's hopes are fulfilled, as a wizard named Gwonam arrives on a magic carpet, telling them that Ganon (the series' antagonist) and his minions have taken over the island of Koridai. Although the King immediately offers his aid, Gwonam explains that according to a prophecy, "only Link can defeat Ganon". Link then asks Princess Zelda for a kiss for good luck but Zelda refuses, to which Link chuckles in response. Gwonam then transports Link to Koridai and explains that many of Ganon's minions have established giant stone statues known as "the faces of evil" that act as their bases of operation, and that the young boy had to conquer each. Link ventures through the island and conquers all the faces along with defeating their leaders such as the necromancer, Goronu, the anthropomorphic pig and jokester, Harlequin, the fire-breathing armored knight, Militron, the gluttonies cyclops, Glutko, and the anthropomorphic and sinister wolf, Lupay. During Link's quest, Gwonam discovers and informs him that Ganon has captured Zelda and imprisoned her in his lair.

At one point during Link's adventure, he discovers the sacred Book of Koriadi which he brings to a translator named Aypo who revels to him that the book is the only way to defeat Ganon. Link finally confronts Ganon, who attempts to recruit him with the promise of great power and the threat of death. Link then defeats him, imprisoning him within the Book of Koriadi, before he rescues Zelda and awakens her. Gwonam appears and congratulates Link on his success and then transports the two on his magic carpet show them the liberated and recovering Koriadi before he officially declares Link the hero of the island. Once again, Link requests Zelda to kiss him as a reward but she still refuses.

Zelda: The Wand of Gamelon
King Harkinian announces his plan to aid Duke Onkled of Gamelon, who is under attack by the forces of Ganon, and orders his daughter, Zelda, to send Link for backup if she does not hear from him within a month. He reassures her that he is taking the Triforce of Courage, which will protect him while Zelda's elderly nursemaid, Impa, promises that the Triforce of Wisdom will ensure the King's return. A month passes without word from the King, so Zelda sends Link to find him. When he too goes missing, Zelda ventures off to Gamelon to find both Link and the King, accompanied by Impa.

During Zelda's quest in Gamelon, Impa discovers that King Harkinian has been captured by Ganon and that Link was engaged in a battle, with his fate being unknown. As she adventures across the island, Zelda defeats many of Ganon's minions including the villainous mummy Gibdo, the wicked three witches of the Fairy Pool, the intimidating knight, Iron Knuckle, the evil sorcerer, Wizzrobe, and the shape-shifting, Omfak. Eventually, Zelda rescues a woman named Lady Alma, who gives her a canteen that she claims Link gave her in exchange for a kiss. On reaching Dodomai Palace, it is revealed that Duke Onkled has betrayed the King by willingly collaborating with Ganon by permitting him to take over Gamelon and allow the King's capture. Zelda storms the palace, defeats Ganon's henchman, Hektan, and saves a prisoner named Lord Kiro (sometimes known as Fari) who accompanied the King before his capture. Kiro then reveals the secret entrance to Onkled's chamber, and when they confront him he reveals the entrance to Reesong Palace, where Ganon has taken residence. 

Zelda travels to the Shrine of Gamelon to obtain the Wand needed to defeat Ganon, then makes her way to Reesong Palace where she fights him. After incapacitating Ganon with the Wand, she rescues her father. Back at Hyrule Castle, Lord Kiro turns Duke Onkled over to the King, begging for mercy. The King orders him to scrub all the floors in Hyrule as punishment. Although Link's whereabouts are still unknown, a comment by Lady Alma prompts Zelda to throw her mirror against the wall, and as it smashes, Link magically materializes, seemingly having been trapped in the mirror. They decide to celebrate Gamelon's return to peace with a feast and begin to laugh since all is well again.

Development

In 1989, Nintendo signed a deal with Sony to begin development of a CD-ROM-based add-on for the Super NES (see Super NES CD-ROM) that would allow for FMV and larger games. However, Nintendo broke the agreement and instead signed with Philips to make the add-on, which caused Sony to spin off their add-on into its own console called the PlayStation. Witnessing the poor reception of the Sega Mega-CD, Nintendo scrapped the idea of making an add-on entirely. As part of dissolving the agreement with Philips, Nintendo gave them the license to use five of their characters, including Link, Princess Zelda, Ganon, and Mario for games on Philips's console, the CD-i, after the partnership's dissolution.

Contracting out to independent studios, Philips subsequently used the characters to create three games for the CD-i, with Nintendo taking no part in their development except to give input on the look of the characters based on the artwork from Nintendo's original two games and that of their respective instruction booklets.<ref name="retrogamer27">{{cite magazine|date=August 2006|title=The Making of... Zelda: 'Wand of Gamelon' & 'Link: Faces of Evil'''|url=https://archive.org/details/RetroGamer27|magazine=Retro Gamer|issue=27|pages=52–57|access-date=February 1, 2019}}</ref> Philips insisted that the development studios utilize all aspects of the CD-i's capabilities, including FMV, high-resolution graphics, and CD-quality music. Because the system had not been designed as a dedicated video game console, there were several technical limitations, such as unresponsive controls (especially for the standard infrared controller), and numerous problems in streaming audio, memory, disc access, and graphics. The first two games were showcased at the 1993 CES and surprised audiences with their degree of animation.The Faces of Evil and The Wand of Gamelon were the first two Nintendo-licensed games released on the Philips CD-i. They were given the relatively low budget of approximately $600,000, and the development deadline was set at a little over a year – to be split between the two games. It was decided by Animation Magic, the Cambridge, Massachusetts-based development team led by Dale DeSharone, that the two games would be developed in tandem and would share the same graphics engine in order to make more efficient use of the budget.

The rest of the development team included three programmers (all previous employees of Spinnaker Software), musician Tony Trippi, and freelance writer Jonathan Merritt, who created the scripts and designs. Under DeSharone's direction, development progressed similarly to that of his game Below the Root, which Retro Gamers John Szczepaniak suggested was as a forerunner. Background designs were created by local Cambridge artists. The animated cutscenes were created by a team of animators from Russia, led by Igor Razboff, who were flown to the United States for the project. These games marked the first time that Russian outsourcing had been utilized by an American games company – a move that was only possible due to the somewhat thawed political climate after the fall of the Berlin Wall.

For voice acting, Animation Magic auditioned local New England community theater actors. Jeffrey Rath was cast as Link. In a 2010 interview with The Gaming Liberty, Rath stated that there were two-hour recording sessions after roughly 15 minutes of rehearsals. Bonnie Jean Wilbur was cast as Zelda and her husband Paul Wann played various character including Gwonam. Mark Berry provided the voices of King Harkinian and Ganon while Impa was voiced by Eve Karpf. Additional voices were provided by Jeffrey Nelson, Natalie Brown, Phil Miller, Chris Flockton, John Mahon, Josie McElroy, Jerry Goodwin, Karen Grace, and Marguerite Scott.

Reception
Contemporary responses
At the time of its release, contemporary criticism was mixed for both games. SNES Force magazine described the animated sequences as "breathtaking" and praised the game for its high-resolution graphics and its "brilliant" use of sound and speech. Highly anticipated by the French video game press, Joystick magazine's development preview of The Faces of Evil described it as a veritable arcade-quality game with stunning graphics and "perfect animation". They gave The Wand of Gamelon similar praise, and gave it additional praise for its use of voice acting, its plot and its backgrounds.ECTS 93: CDi Philips - Zelda: The Wand of Gamelon. Joystick. No.38. Pp.43. May 1993. The same magazine would ultimately score The Faces of Evil 79%, a few months later, giving particularly high marks for music, sound effects and play-through time.

Other publications gave more negative reviews. CDi Magazine rated The Faces of Evil 65%, stating that the game was a poor relation to the original Nintendo games and singling out the perfunctory storyline, the lack of graphical features like parallax and the slow and repetitive gameplay. Another reviewer for the magazine gave The Wand of Gamelon a higher 75% and called it a "reasonably good game" for its puzzles and animated sequences, but criticized its plot and controls.Toor, Mat. "Games - Link The Faces of Evil". CDi Magazine (Andy Clough, ed.). Haymarket Publishing, UK. Issue 2. Pg.24. October 1993. In 1994, Edge reported that as CD-i sales began to suffer, criticism sharpened, and the games were described as low-cost, low-risk ventures that had failed to excite any interest in the platform.

Re-evaluation and infamyLink: The Faces of Evil and Zelda: The Wand of Gamelon have been met with negative reviews in retrospect. Wired magazine said that the animation in both games was extremely simple and stilted and that the graphics had several glitches. IGNs Travis Fahs criticized the games for using a style similar to Zelda II: The Adventure of Link, for "insufferable" controls, and for the designers' poor understanding of the Legend of Zelda franchise. He noted, however, that the backgrounds looked decent considering the poor design of the CD-i's hardware. IGN's Peer Schneider criticized The Wand of Gamelon for not effectively indicating when a platform begins or ends, and also said its controls were "sloppy". Schneider also argued that the decision to star Zelda in The Wand of Gamelon may have been based on the fact that the CD-i's library was directed at women. However, he felt that they failed at this due to Zelda playing the same role as Link.

The games' animated cutscenes and voice acting drew particular criticism. The Star Tribune described the voice acting as "laughable", and it was also criticized by Zelda Elements as "jarring". IGN described the cutscenes as "infamous" and "cheesy"; other reviewers described them as "freakish" and "an absolute joke". Schneider felt that the cutscenes in The Wand of Gamelon were "entertaining... for all the wrong reasons".

The games' soundtracks drew mixed responses. Zelda Elements felt it was "average" and not up to the usual Zelda quality, while Schneider described the soundtrack as "redbook audio CD pop". This has been contested by other reviewers, who described it as diverse, high-quality and superb with an adventurous upbeat tempo blending "delicious '80s synth", electric guitar, panpipes, marimbas, and other unusual instruments.

Despite the largely negative reception that the games have received, there have been a few positive reviews as well. Both Danny Cowan of 1UP.com and John Szczepaniak of Hardcore Gaming 101 praised Faces of Evil and Wand of Gamelon as among the best games on the CD-i. Szczepaniak in particular suggested that several of the magazines that had rated and reviewed Wand of Gamelon and Faces of Evil had engaged in hate campaigns having never even played the game. Their praises drew from the games' detailed, well-drawn in-game backgrounds (which was described as both Gigeresque and Monet-esque) and "pretty decent" gameplay, although both criticized the controls. According to Szczepaniak, the games' controls work best when played with a hardwired three-button CD-i control pad, as opposed to the CD-i's "crappy infrared remote".

In a periodical for Retro Gamer magazine, Szczepaniak suggested that the natural comparison of the games by reviewers to the quality of games in the rest of the Zelda series was an improper comparison to make, arguing that when reviewed in their own right, the games were actually excellent. Contrary to what were described as "lies perpetuated about [Faces of Evil and Wand of Gamelon]", Retro Gamer described the games as "astoundingly good" and rated them together as number ten in its "Perfect Ten Games" for CD-i. While acknowledging that they were non-canonical, the games were praised for exhilarating pacing and superb gameplay design.

Unofficial remakes of both games were developed in GameMaker by amateur developer Dopply in an effort to teach himself game development. After four years of development, the remakes were released in November 2020 for Linux and Microsoft Windows. The remakes feature the same assets and gameplay as the original releases and add several quality-of-life improvements. In addition to subtitles for cutscenes and a widescreen mode, the remakes add new unlockable content and the ability to choose between the original gameplay style and "Remastered Mode", which makes various gameplay changes to reduce player frustration. To avoid receiving a cease-and-desist notice from Nintendo like many similar fan projects, Dopply made the remakes unavailable for download two days after their release.

Various characters from the game, including shopkeeper Morshu and King Harkinian, have gained minor notoriety as internet memes, and have been featured in fan-made 3D animations and YouTube Poop parody videos.

Sales
In 1994, Edge reported that both Faces of Evil and Wand of Gamelon had sold a "respectable number of units", but IGN claimed that sales of CD-i games (including these two) were poor and caused them to be readily available years later.

RankingsIGNs Peer Schneider ranked the two games among Nintendo's biggest failures (despite the games not being made by Nintendo). Electronic Gaming Monthly contributor Seanbaby ranked Zelda: Wand of Gamelon the sixth worst game of all time, while GameTrailers rated it fifth worst game of all time.The Wand of Gamelon appeared in an IGN bracket poll of "The Greatest Legend of Zelda Game" along with Zelda's Adventure. It lost in the first set of rounds to The Legend of Zelda: A Link to the Past.

See also
 Zelda's Adventure (the third Zelda'' game released for the CD-i)

References

1993 video games
CD-i games
Nintendo CD-i games
Video games developed in Russia
Video games developed in the United States
Metroidvania games
Video game memes
Single-player video games
The Legend of Zelda spin-off games
Internet memes introduced in 2007